Igor Bonciucov (born 16 March 1973) in Dubăsari, Transnistria, Moldovan SSR. Bonciucov has served as a professional cyclist in three non consecutive years.

He competed in the men's individual road race at the 1996 Summer Olympics. In 2001, he won the Moldovan National Road Race.

Major achievements
1998
Tour of Romania, overall winner

References

1973 births
Living people
Moldovan male cyclists
Olympic cyclists of Moldova
Cyclists at the 1996 Summer Olympics